Souhel Najjar is a Syrian-American neurologist whose story with Susannah Cahalan turned into an American drama film. He was the first physician in New York University history to identify the mechanism of interaction between the immune system and the central nervous system. He is considered an expert in the field of encephalopathy, specifically the treatment of encephalitis.

He was selected as a recipient of 2020 Ellis Island Medal of Honor.

See also
 Susannah Cahalan
 Brain on Fire: My Month of Madness
 Brain on Fire (film)

References

External links 
 Souhel Najjar, MD at Northwell Health

Year of birth missing (living people)
Living people
Syrian neurologists
Syrian emigrants to the United States
Damascus University alumni
Albany Medical College alumni
American neurologists
New York University Grossman School of Medicine faculty